Eupithecia dryinombra is a moth of the family Geometridae. It was first described by Edward Meyrick in 1899. It is endemic to the Hawaiian islands of Molokai and Hawaii.

References

dryinombra
Endemic moths of Hawaii
Moths described in 1899